MediaCorp Teletext was a Singaporean teletext information service provided by MediaCorp. It was carried on MediaCorp's Channel 5, Channel 8 and Channel NewsAsia. On top of the standard information carried by most teletext providers, it also carried information unique to Singapore, such as COE and ERP rates, announcements from selected ministries in Singapore and lottery results.

The service was also accessible over the Internet since 1999 until its shutdown in 2013.

History
The service was launched on Channel 5 and Channel 8 on 1 August 1983, being the first teletext service in Asia. It was called SBCtext when it was initially launched. It was later expanded to Channel News Asia when the channel was launched on 1 March 1999.

Teletext Classifieds was shut down on 1 September 2012.

On 3 September 2013, MediaCorp announced that the service will be discontinued from 30th of that month due to “declining usage”.

Content
Teletext was provided on three MediaCorp channels, with each channel specialising in specific types of information. Teletext on Channel 5 specialised in entertainment and lifestyle information, Classifieds on Channel 8 and business information on Channel News Asia.

Teletext Online 
When the service was still online, the Teletext versions of all three channels were available for browsing via the Internet and features a nearly up-to-date version of the Teletext shown on television (delays might be up to 10 minutes). As with the Teletext on television, this service is now discontinued.

References

External links
Teletext Online

Teletext
Teletext
1983 establishments in Singapore
2013 disestablishments in Singapore